Henry George Higgins (1907-date of death unknown) was an English athlete.

Athletics
He competed in the 220 yards at the 1930 British Empire Games for England.

Personal life
He was a market clerk at the time of the 1930 Games and lived in Ilford.

References

1907 births
Year of death missing
English male sprinters
People from Ilford
Athletes (track and field) at the 1930 British Empire Games
Commonwealth Games competitors for England